The TI-92 series of graphing calculators are a line of calculators produced by Texas Instruments. They include: the TI-92 (1995), the TI-92 II (1996), the TI-92 Plus (1998, 1999)  and the Voyage 200 (2002). The design of these relatively large calculators includes a QWERTY keyboard. Because of this keyboard, it was given the status of a "computer" rather than "calculator" by American testing facilities and cannot be used on tests such as the SAT or AP Exams while the similar TI-89 can be.

TI-92
The TI-92 was originally released in 1995, and was the first symbolic calculator made by Texas Instruments. It came with a computer algebra system (CAS) based on Derive, geometry based on Cabri II, and was one of the first calculators to offer 3D graphing.  The TI-92 was not allowed on most standardized tests due mostly to its QWERTY keyboard. Its larger size was also rather cumbersome compared to other graphing calculators. In response to these concerns, Texas Instruments introduced the TI-89 which is functionally similar to the original TI-92, but featured Flash ROM and 188 KB RAM, and a smaller design without the QWERTY keyboard.  The TI-92 was then replaced by the TI-92 Plus, which was essentially a TI-89 with the larger QWERTY keyboard design of the TI-92.  Eventually, TI released the Voyage 200, which is a smaller, lighter version of the TI-92 Plus with more Flash ROM.
The TI-92 is no longer sold through TI or its dealers, and is very hard to come by in stores.

TI-92 II
The TI-92 II was released in 1996, and was the first successor to the TI-92. 
The TI-92 II was available both as a stand-alone product, and as a user-installable II module which could be added to original TI-92 units to gain most of the feature improvements. The TI-92 II module was introduced early in 1996 and added the choice of 5 user languages (English, French, German, Italian and Spanish) and an additional 128k User memory. Along with the TI-92, the TI-92 II was replaced by the TI-92 Plus in 1999, which offered even more Flash ROM and RAM.

TI-92 Plus

The TI-92 Plus (or TI-92+) was released in 1998, slightly after the creation of the almost-identical (in terms of software) TI-89, while physically looking exactly like its predecessor, the TI-92 (which lacked flash memory). Besides increased memory over its predecessor, the TI-92 Plus also featured a sharper "black" screen, which had first appeared on the TI-89 and which eases viewing.

The TI-92 Plus was available both as a stand-alone product, and as a user-installable Plus module which could be added to original TI-92 and TI-92 II units to gain most of the feature improvements, most notably Flash Memory.  A stand-alone TI-92 Plus calculator was functionally similar to the HW2 TI-89, while a module-upgraded TI-92 was functionally similar to the HW1 TI-89.  Both versions could run the same releases of operating system software.

As of 2002, the TI-92 Plus was succeeded by the Voyage 200 and is no longer sold through TI or its dealers.

The TI-92 Plus is now available in an online emulator, featuring a list of frequently used commands.

Voyage 200

Voyage 200 (also V200 and Voyage 200 PLT) was released in 2002, being the replacement for the TI-92 Plus, with its only hardware upgrade over that calculator being an increase in the amount of flash memory available (2.7 megabytes for the Voyage 200 vs. 702 kilobytes for the TI-92 Plus).  It also features a somewhat smaller and more rounded case design.

Like its predecessor, Voyage 200 is an advanced calculator that supports plotting multiple functions on the same graph, parametric, polar, 3D, and differential equation graphing as well as sequence representations. Its symbolic calculation system is based on a trimmed version of the calculation software Derive. In addition to its algebra and calculus capabilities, the Voyage 200 is packaged with list, spreadsheet, and data processing applications and can perform curve fitting to a number of standard functions and other statistical analysis operations. The calculator can also run most programs written for the TI-89 and TI-92 as well as programs specifically written for it. A large number of applications, ranging from games to interactive periodic tables can be found online.

The V200 is easily mistaken for a PDA or a small computer because of its massive enclosure and its full QWERTY keyboard — a feature which disqualifies the calculator for use in many tests and examinations, including the American ACT and SAT. The TI-89 Titanium offers exactly the same functionality in a smaller format that is also legal on the SAT test, but not the ACT test.

Features

Technical specifications

Note. Official page specifies user-available ROM amount for TI-92 Plus as 702K, but other sources specify it as 388K. This is due to the TI-92 Plus coming with Cabri Geometry pre-installed, which uses the 314 KB difference.

See also
Comparison of Texas Instruments graphing calculators

References

External links
Official documentation: features of the Voyage 200.

Graphing calculators
Texas Instruments programmable calculators
Computer algebra systems
68k-based mobile devices
Products introduced in 1995
Products introduced in 1998
Products introduced in 2002